SSCV Hermod was a semi-submersible crane vessel operated by Heerema Marine Contractors.

History
Semi submersible crane vessel (SSCV) Hermod was constructed in 1979 by Mitsui Engineering & Shipbuilding Co., Ltd. Hermod and sister vessel, Balder were the world's first semi-submersible crane vessels. In the early 1980s these vessels set several lift records while operating in the North Sea.

Hermod was retired at the end of 2017. She was loaded on Dockwise Vanguard and taken to Dinghai District, Zhejiang province for scrapping at Zhoushan Changhong International Ship Recycling. 98% of the ship's materials will be reused.

Design
The hull consisted of two floaters with three columns each. The transit draught of 12 meters was normally ballasted down to 25 meters for lifting operations; at that load, the floaters (with a draught of 12 meters) were well-submerged, reducing the effect of waves and swell.

Propulsion was by two controllable pitch propellers and two forward, retractable, controllable pitch thrusters. The helicopter deck was capable of sustaining a Sikorsky 61-N. Up to 336 people could be supported in the air conditioned living quarters.

Cranes
The Hermod had two cranes at the stern. In 1984, the lifting capacities were upgraded to  respectively. A tandem lift using the main hoists could lift  at a  radius.

Footnotes

External links
 

Semi-submersibles
Ships built by Mitsui Engineering and Shipbuilding
Crane vessels
1979 ships